Carlos Alberto Preciado Benítez (born 30 March 1985) is a Colombian professional soccer player who currently plays as a forward for FC Carlos Stein.

Professional career

Preciado began his career with his hometown club América de Cali. During his time with América, Preciado made appearances for both the first team and the reserve squad. In 2005, Preciado was loaned to lower division team Real Cartagena. He was released by América after the 2008 season and joined Deportivo Pereira. After impressing with Deportivo Pereira, Preciado rejoined América but was released again after one season. From 2011 to 2013, spent a season each with Colombian clubs Millonarios F.C., Deportes Tolima, and Envigado F.C.

In 2014, Preciado joined his first non-Colombian team, Peru's León de Huánuco. Preciado performed well in Huánuco and the following season he was brought on by Alianza Lima.

On January 7, 2016, Preciado joined Qatari club Al-Sailiya SC. He made his debut on January 27, playing 87 minutes in a 3–1 victory over Al-Mesaimeer. Preciado's first two goals for ASSC came on February 13, during a 2–3 loss to Al-Wakrah.

After just 10 games in the Qatari Stars League, Preciado transferred to the North American Soccer League's Tampa Bay Rowdies on July 19, 2016.

References

External links
 Tampa Bay Rowdies biography
 

1985 births
Tampa Bay Rowdies players
Association football forwards
Colombian footballers
Millonarios F.C. players
América de Cali footballers
Real Cartagena footballers
Deportivo Pereira footballers
Deportes Tolima footballers
Envigado F.C. players
León de Huánuco footballers
Club Alianza Lima footballers
Al-Sailiya SC players
Sport Huancayo footballers
Al-Shamal SC players
Unión Comercio footballers
Ayacucho FC footballers
FC Carlos Stein players
North American Soccer League players
Qatari Second Division players
Categoría Primera A players
Peruvian Primera División players
Living people
Footballers from Cali
Expatriate soccer players in the United States
Expatriate footballers in Qatar
Expatriate footballers in Peru
Colombian expatriates in the United States
Colombian expatriate sportspeople in Peru